Jopling is an English-language surname, sometimes spelled as Jobling. According to the Guild of One-Name Studies, the Jopling variant was primarily used in County Durham and Jobling in Northumberland, and in both cases the final "g" was sometimes dropped to distinguish different family branches, leading to the surnames Joplin and Joblin. Notable individuals with the surname include:

Jopling 
 Daisy Jopling (born 1969), British violinist
 James Jopling, founder of the Joplings department store
 Jay Jopling (born 1963), British art dealer
 Joe Jopling (born 1951), English footballer
 Louise Jopling (1843–1933), English painter 
 Michael Jopling, Baron Jopling (born 1930), British politician 
 William Jopling (1911–1997), British leprologist

Jobling 
 Andrew Jobling (born 1964), Australian footballer
 Curtis Jobling (born 1972), British illustrator
 James Wesley Jobling (1876–1961), American physician
 Joe Jobling (1906–1969), English footballer
 John Jobling (born 1937), Australian politician
 Karen Jobling (born 1962), English cricketer
 Keith Jobling (born 1934), English footballer
 Kevin Jobling (born 1968), English footballer
 Robert Jobling (1841–1923), British artist

See also 
 Christine Joblin, French astrochemist
 Joplin (surname)

References